The Haiti national football team (Haitian Creole: Ekip foutbòl Ayiti) represents Haiti in international football. Haiti is administered by the Fédération Haïtienne de Football (FHF), the governing body for football in Haiti. They have been a member of FIFA since 1934, a member of CONCACAF since 1961 and a member of the Caribbean Football Union (CFU) since 1978. Haiti's home ground is Stade Sylvio Cator in Port-au-Prince and the team's manager is Jean-Jacques Pierre.

Haiti has one of the longest football traditions in the region and were the second Caribbean team to make the World Cup, after qualifying from winning the 1973 CONCACAF Championship. It was their only appearance in 1974, where they were beaten in the opening group stage by its other three teams, who were all pre-tournament favorites; Italy, Poland, and Argentina.

In 2016, Haiti qualified for the 100th anniversary of the Copa América, by defeating Trinidad and Tobago.

History

Early years

Following the affiliation of the Haitian Football Federation with FIFA in 1933, Haiti was able to register for the qualifiers for the 1934 World Cup in Italy. Les Grenadiers led by coach Édouard Baker, played three games against Cuba, all at the Parc Leconte in Port-au-Prince, having lost twice (1–3, 0–6) and one resulting in a 1–1 draw.

Haiti would then reappear on the international scene almost twenty years later, since the Federation did not enter the national team for the World Cup qualifiers of the 1938 and 1950. For the 1954 edition held in Switzerland, the team under Frenchman Baron Paul found themselves in a qualification pool with the United States and Mexico. Haiti finished in last place, losing all of its matches, with a very heavy defeat conceded to Mexico 8–0. They would again withdraw from the qualifiers for the World Cup until 1970. Regionally, Haiti won in 1957 in their first participation in the CCCF Championship including a blowout victory against Cuba 6–1 and debuted in the 1959 Pan American Games. The selection is defeated heavily by the United States 7–2, and Brazil 9–1, and refused to resume play against Argentina after an arbitration decision. Victorious against Cuba 8–2, the team finished fourth in the competition. After a 1960 season without international meetings, Haiti led by Antoine Tassy, made its second appearance in CCCF Cup in 1961. Second in their group stage behind the host country, Costa Rica, the team finished last the final stage with three defeats in three games and twelve goals conceded to zero goals scored and finished fourth. The team suffered a crushing defeat in its last match to Costa Rica 8–0.

In 1961, Haiti joined the CONCACAF, born from the merger of the NAFC and the CCCF. In 1965, Haiti took part in the second edition of the CONCACAF Championship, after being eliminated in qualifying for the inaugural edition (1963 CONCACAF Championship). This continental meeting resulted in a last place finish, losing all five of its matches played; coach Antoine Tassy then resigns. However, he returned the following year again as the team's head coach, and won the Coupe Duvalier. During the 1967 Qualifiers, Haiti finished first and was undefeated atop of its group, ahead of Trinidad and Tobago. On 16 January 1967, marked its first victory in a competitive match against the Trinidadians, beating them 4–2. However, Haiti in the final round consisting of six teams, finished in fifth place, defeating Nicaragua 2–1 to avoid last place.

As part of the qualifiers for the 1970 World Cup hosted by Mexico, Haiti are engaged in group 2, in the company of Guatemala and Trinidad and Tobago. Directed by Antoine Tassy, Haiti was relevant for the first time in qualifying for the World Cup on 23 November 1968, in Port of Spain against Trinidad and Tobago. Haiti will reach rank at the top of the pool with wins against Trinidad and Tobago 4–0 and Guatemala 2–0, one draw against Guatemala 1–1, and one defeat conceded at home against Trinidad and Tobago 2–4 which enabled them to qualify to the second round. They then eliminated the United States before heading to the final round against El Salvador. Haiti lost the opening match at home 1–2, but managed to rebound and win 3–0 in San Salvador before losing again on neutral ground in Kingston in Jamaica, 1–0 in overtime.

At the CONCACAF Championship in 1969, Haiti was disqualified from the final round, when it had qualified in the field by beating the United States (the qualifying round is coupled with the qualifications for the World Cup 1970). Instead, the Federation was unable to register its team for the final round on time to the CONCACAF and therefore could not participate in the final round.

The Golden Age

The 1970s could be considered a golden age for Haitian football. Its status in the region remained very strong, being considered the third strongest team in the CONCACAF after Mexico and arguably Costa Rica. With Antoine Tassy as coach for much of this period, Haiti emerged as one of the strongest teams in the CONCACAF zone, being pooled with other regionally strong football nations such as Mexico and Costa Rica. By 1965, players like Henri Francillon, Philippe Vorbe, Guy Renold Jean François and Guy Saint-Vil were already playing in the team and would be stalwarts of the side in the coming years.

The team reached the final round of the qualifiers for the 1970 World Cup, where they faced El Salvador. After losing the first leg 2–1 at home, the team pulled off a 3–0 win at El Salvador. With each team having one win, the rules of the day dictated a play-off on neutral ground which El Salvador won to secure a place in the 1970 World Cup.

In the 1974 World Cup qualifiers, Haiti once again reached the final round in a qualifying tournament completely played at home. This time, they topped the group and qualified for their first appearance at the 1974 World Cup. In West Germany, they drew a tough group consisting of Italy, Argentina and Poland. The first half of their debut game against Italy ended in a scoreless draw, but the team surprised the football world when star forward Emmanuel Sanon scored shortly after the break to give Haiti a 1–0 lead. Although the Italians eventually came back to win the game 3–1, Sanon's goal ended goal keeper Dino Zoff's record run of 1143 minutes without conceding a goal in international matches. The team went on to lose to Poland (0–7) and Argentina (1–4) to finish last in their group.

Post 1970s
Haiti would reach the final rounds of the 1978 and 1982 qualifiers, but failed to make the cut. The years since have seen Haiti's footballing status decline markedly. In recent years, the political situation in the country has led to numerous defections from members of the football team. The team has rebuilt somewhat through the Haitian diaspora in Miami, Florida, and some Haitian home games have been played in Miami in recent years. Haiti as of recently has been rising once again as a footballing power in the CONCACAF.at least 30 people with ties to Haitian football perished, including players, coaches, referees and administrative and medical representatives. Twenty others with ties to Haitian football were feared to be buried in the ruins.

Post Earthquake
In November 2011, Haiti was knocked out of the qualifiers for the 2014 World Cup by Antigua and Barbuda under the leadership of Brazilian coach Edson Tavares. In 2012, Tavares was replaced by Cuban coach Israel Blake Cantero who led the national team through the 2012 Caribbean Championship. Haiti finished third in the Caribbean Championship warranting a spot in the 2013 Gold Cup. The following year, Haiti would have a bad string of defeats against Chile, Bolivia, Oman and the Dominican Republic. In June 2013, Haiti bounced back from these shortcomings with a close 2–1 loss to reigning world champions Spain and an impressive 2–2 draw with footballing powerhouse Italy, with goals in both games scored by Wilde-Donald Guerrier, Olrish Saurel and Jean-Philippe Peguero respectively. The 2018 World Cup qualifiers had Haiti beating Grenada to reach the fourth round, where they fell off with only four points - one for a goalless draw with Panama, three for beating Jamaica in Kingston. In 2019, they made the farthest they ever had in the CONCACAF Gold Cup by going 3–0 in the group stages including a last-minute goal against Costa Rica and coming back from a 2–0 deficit against Canada in the Quarter-finals, winning the game 3–2. However, it all stopped after Mexico got away with a controversial foul which gave Mexico a penalty shot. They would lose the game 1–0.

Team image

Colours
The Haiti national team utilizes a two-colour system, composed of red and blue. The team's two colours originate from the national flag of Haiti, known as the bicolore. Although, during the Duvalier administration in Haiti, the country undergone a color change to its flag, swapping out the blue for black and it reflected in its 1974 World Cup kit and federation crest.

Since the team's inception, Haiti's kit has undergone numerous color pattern variations. The home kit has traditionally been either all blue or a variation of predominately blue shirts, with red shorts and blue socks, while the away kit has traditionally been inversely worn that is either all red or a variation of predominately red shirts, with blue shorts and red socks. Haiti has occasionally had a third kit, which has traditionally been all white, which the current kit features, along with its all blue colours at home and all red colours away. Haiti also wears the crest of the Federation on its shirt and at times on its shorts as well.

Haiti has been provided kits by a number of manufacturers, some of which have been from a few local and lesser known suppliers. The first known kit manufacturer was Adidas for the 1974 World Cup. In 2013, a five-year contract was reached with Colombian manufacturer, Saeta for $1 million. After 8 years, the Haitian Federation and Saeta are terminating their agreement. The details of the end date of their contract and the reason for the termination has not yet been released to the general public.

Kit suppliers

Results and fixtures
The following is a list of match results in the last 12 months, as well as any future matches that have been scheduled.

2022

2023

Coaching staff

Current staff

Coaching history

Caretaker managers are listed in italics.

 Édouard Baker (1934)
 Antoine Champagne (1951)
 Paul Baron (fr) (1953–1954)
 Dan Georgiádis (1956–1957)
 Lucien Barozy (1957)
 Alfredo Obertello (1959)
 Antoine Tassy (1959) 1961; 1965–1973

 Ettore Trevisan (it) (1973)
 Antoine Tassy (1973–1974)
 Mladen Kashanine (1975)
 Antoine Tassy (1976?)
 Sepp Piontek (1976–1978)
 René Vertus (fr) (1978–1979)−1980?)
 Antoine Tassy (1980–1981) 

 Claude Barthélemy (1984–1985)

 Ernst Jean-Baptiste (fr) (1991–1992) 1994 
 Hervé Calixte (1996–1997)

 Jean-Michel Vaval (1997–1999)
 Ernst Jean-Baptiste (1999)
 Bernard Souilliez (1999)
 Emmanuel Sanon (1999–2000)
 Elie Jean & Sonche Pierre (fr) (2001)
 Jorge Castelli (es) (2001–2002)
 Vicente Cayetano Rodríguez (es) (2002–2003)
 Andrés Cruciani (2002–2003)
 Caetano Rodrigues (2003)
 Maxime Augusto (2003)
 Carlo Marcelin (fr) (2003)
 Fernando Clavijo (2003–2004)
 Carlo Marcelin (2004–2006)
 Luis Armelio García (es) (2006–2008)
 Sonche Pierre, Carlo Marcelin & Wilner Étienne (2008)
 Wagneau Eloip (2008)
 Wilner Étienne & Sonche Pierre (2008)
 Jairo Ríos (es) (2008–2010)
 Edson Tavares (2010–2011)
 Carlo Marcelin (2011)
 Israel Blake Cantero (2012–2013)
 Pierre Roland Saint-Jean (fr) (2013)
 Marc Collat (2014–2015)
 Patrice Neveu (2015–2016)
 Jean-Claude Josaphat (fr) (2016–2017)
 Marc Collat (2017–2019)
 Jean-Jacques Pierre (2021–)

Notes
p Denotes a player-manager

Players

Current squad
 The following 23 players were called up for the 2022–23 CONCACAF Nations League matches.
 Match dates: 25 and 28 March 2023
 Opposition:  and 
 Caps and goals correct as of: 14 June 2022, after the match against 

Recent call-ups
The following players have been called up within the last twelve months.

INJ Withdrew due to an injury.
PRE Preliminary squad.
WD Withdrew from the squad due to non-injury issues.

Previous squads

FIFA World Cup
1974 FIFA World Cup squad

CONCACAF Gold Cup
2000 CONCACAF Gold Cup squad
2002 CONCACAF Gold Cup squad
2007 CONCACAF Gold Cup squad
2009 CONCACAF Gold Cup squad
2013 CONCACAF Gold Cup squad
2015 CONCACAF Gold Cup squad
2019 CONCACAF Gold Cup squad
2021 CONCACAF Gold Cup squad

Copa América 
2016 Copa América squad

Player records

The FHF's archives have been displaced by earthquakes and civil unrest; data on early Haitian players is still being investigated. 
Players in bold are still active with Haiti.

Most appearances

Most goals

Competitive record

FIFA World Cup

Olympic Games

CONCACAF Gold Cup

CONCACAF Nations League

Copa América

1 Ecuador 1993 was the first time nations from outside the CONMEBOL were invited.
2 United States 2016 was the first time nations from outside the CONMEBOL could qualify and host.

Pan American Games

Central American and Caribbean Games

CCCF Championship

CFU Caribbean Cup

*Draws include knockout matches decided on penalty kicks.

HonoursMajor competitionsFIFA World Cup Best performance: Round 1, 1974CCCF Championship Winners (1): 1957CONCACAF Championship / Gold Cup Winners (1): 1973
 Runners-up (2): 1971, 1977
 Third place (1): 2019Minor competitionsCFU Championship / Caribbean Cup Winners (2): 1979, 2007
 Runners-up (1): 2001
 Third place (5): 1978, 1998, 1999, 2012, 2014
 Fair play (1): 2014Pan American Games Fourth place (1): 1959CONCACAF Olympic Qualifying Tournament Fourth place (1): 1980Friendly competitionsSaint Kitts and Nevis Football Festival Winners (1): 2003Haiti International Tournament Winners (1): 1997Coupe Duvalier Winners (1): 1966Triangular Tournament Winners (1): 1956Paul Magloire President Cup Winners (1):''' 1956

See also
 Haiti women's national football team
 Haiti national under-23 football team
 Haiti national under-20 football team
 Haiti national under-17 football team
 Haiti national under-15 football team
 Haiti at the FIFA World Cup

References

External links

 
 Haiti National Football Team Profile, Stats and Analytics at Footballdatabase
 National Football Teams: Haiti
 Haiti National Football Team (The Red & Blue) at 11v11
 Fixtures and Results at FIFA.com
 Haiti Football Kit History

 
Caribbean national association football teams